"La fête" is a song performed by French-Israeli singer Amir Haddad. The song was released as a digital download on 10 June 2020 by Parlophone and Warner Music Group as the lead single from his fourth studio album Ressources. The song was written by Amir Haddad and Nazim Khaled.

Background
Speaking to Le Parisien, Amir said that he had written this song well before the COVID-19 lockdowns, and said "I want it to become the song where at each party with friends, in your house or in a bar or on vacation, you will put it on and that's when everyone will lose it, throw towels in the air, raise their glasses and dance like crazy."

Critical reception
Jonathan Vautrey from Wiwibloggs said, "Starting with an electric guitar riff, the song utilises a mixture of percussion instrumentation. While not a full-on party feel as the title might suggest, the melody is still relatively danceable. Lyrically, Amir sings about forgetting your troubles and enjoying life to its fullest: 'You're tired from yesterday again / It's nothing / We'll think about it tomorrow … We were all born to party / As if we'd never done it before'."

Music video
A music video to accompany the release of "La fête" was first released onto YouTube on 17 June 2020.

Track listing

Personnel
Credits adapted from Tidal.
 Assaf Tzrouya – producer, composer, choir vocals, guitar, keyboards, programming, recorded by
 Amir Haddad – composer, A&R direction, choir vocals, vocals, writer
 Nazim Khaled – composer, A&R direction, choir vocals, executive producer, writer
 Benjamin Marciano – A&R direction
 David Boukhobza – A&R direction, executive producer
 Silvio Lisbonne – A&R direction, choir vocals, executive producer
 Guy Dan – bass
 Itzik Kedem – choir, percussion
 7 Jaws – choir vocals
 Eddy Paradelles – choir vocals
 Idan Bakshi – choir vocals, guitar
 Lital Haddad – choir vocals
 Matan Dror – choir vocals, keyboards, programming
 Mor Uzan – choir vocals, guitar, keyboards, programming
 Pierre-Laurent Faure – choir vocals
 Rubens Hazon – choir vocals
 Tiborg – masterer
 Jérémie Tuil – mixer
 Cynthia Chavan-Letsher – production coordinator

Charts

Weekly charts

Year-end charts

Release history

References

2020 songs
2020 singles
Amir Haddad songs
Songs written by Amir Haddad
Songs written by Nazim Khaled